Jordan Aboki (born March 20, 1993) is a French basketball player who currently plays for Paris-Levallois Basket of the LNB Pro A.

References

External links
LNB profile

1993 births
Living people
French men's basketball players
Metropolitans 92 players
Sportspeople from Créteil
Shooting guards